Findlay is a village in Shelby County, Illinois, United States. The population was 664 at the 2020 census.

Geography
Findlay is located at  (39.521115, -88.754363).

Demographics

As of the census of 2000, there were 723 people, 311 households, and 208 families residing in the village. The racial makeup of the village was 98.48% White, 0.83% African American, 0.28% Native American, 0.28% Asian, and 0.14% from two or more races. Hispanic or Latino of any race were 0.83% of the population.

There were 311 households, out of which 26.0% had children under the age of 18 living with them, 54.3% were married couples living together, 9.3% had a female householder with no husband present, and 32.8% were non-families. 30.2% of all households were made up of individuals, and 15.8% had someone living alone who was 65 years of age or older. The average household size was 2.32 and the average family size was 2.87.

In the village, the population was spread out, with 24.2% under the age of 18, 8.4% from 18 to 24, 27.4% from 25 to 44, 23.2% from 45 to 64, and 16.7% who were 65 years of age or older. The median age was 39 years. For every 100 females, there were 89.8 males. For every 100 females age 18 and over, there were 84.5 males.

The median income for a household in the village was $30,962, and the median income for a family was $39,375. Males had a median income of $37,500 versus $21,438 for females. The per capita income for the village was $15,990. About 8.8% of families and 12.6% of the population were below the poverty line, including 19.0% of those under age 18 and 10.9% of those age 65 or over.

State parks 

Two state parks, Eagle Creek State Park and Wolf Creek State Park, are located near Findlay. Both parks are at Lake Shelbyville — Findlay calls itself "The Heart of Lake Shelbyville" in tourist advertising.

References

External links
A Findlay history website: http://findlayhistory.com/
 Findlay won the 1991-1992 Class A Basketball Tournament, becoming the smallest school to do so: http://www.illinoishsglorydays.com/id529.html

Villages in Shelby County, Illinois
Villages in Illinois